Henry Enthoven is a former rugby union international who represented England in 1878.

Early life
Henry Enthoven was born on 16 March 1855 in Liverpool.

Rugby union career
Enthoven made his international debut and only appearance for England on 11 March 1878 in the match against Ireland match at Lansdowne Road.
In the only match he played for his national side he was on the winning side.

References

1855 births
English rugby union players
England international rugby union players
Rugby union three-quarters
Year of death missing
Rugby union players from Liverpool